The House Mill  is a major Grade I listed building on the River Lea in Mill Meads,  and part of the Three Mills complex. The original tidal mills at this site date back to the Domesday book of 1086, and the present structure of the House Mill was built in 1776 by Daniel Bisson. It was damaged by fire in 1802, and then rebuilt by Philip Metcalfe.
 
It is one of only four Grade I listed buildings in the London Borough of Newham. The House Mill remains the "largest tidal mill standing in Britain", although the water wheels are not in operation.

The south facade of the House Mill displays a coat of arms dated 1776 and the initials "D S B" (which could be Daniel and Sarah Bisson), with forty cast iron wall plates which tie the ends of the floor beams.

The Miller's House was rebuilt in 1995 with a modern interior, but retaining the original facade. The Miller's House and a house on the other side of the House Mill were originally built for the Miller and his family. A Second World War bomb landed on a nearby bonded warehouse and damaged both houses on 15 October 1940 which were later demolished. The Mill stopped operating and was used as a warehouse.

Publications

The following are research papers published by the House Mill (River Lea Tidal Mill Trust Ltd).
 The Three Mills Distillery in the Georgian era by  Keith Fairclough (2003) 
 The LeFevre family and distilling along the Lower Lea by  Keith Fairclough (2003) 
 Owners of the Three Mills (1539–1728) by Keith Fairclough (2003) 
 Philip Metcalfe (1733–1818), the MP and industrialist who built the Clock Mill by Keith Fairclough (2003) 
 The Bisson Family of Three Mills by Keith Fairclough and Brian Strong (2003)

Notes

External links

House Mill website

History of the London Borough of Newham
Grade I listed buildings in the London Borough of Newham
Watermills in London
Grade I listed industrial buildings
Geography of the London Borough of Newham
Mill museums in England
Museums in the London Borough of Newham
Tide mills
River Lea
Flour mills in the United Kingdom
Industrial buildings completed in 1776
Grade I listed water mills
Mill Meads
West Ham